Stephen Williams (born 11 March 1954) was an English cricketer. He was a right-handed batsman and leg-break bowler who played for Gloucestershire. He was born in Rodbourne Cheney.

Williams made a single first-class appearance for the team, during the 1978 season. In the only innings in which he batted, he scored a duck.

Williams made two List A appearances for Wiltshire between 1989 and 1990. He scored a duck on his debut, and 11 runs in his second match.

External links
Stephen Williams at Cricket Archive

1954 births
Living people
English cricketers
Gloucestershire cricketers
Wiltshire cricketers